Weston Lunt (born October 7, 1993) is a former American football quarterback. He played college football for the Illinois Fighting Illini.

High school
During his junior season at Rochester High School in 2010, Lunt led the Rockets to a perfect 14-0 record with a 24-7 victory in the 2010 4A IHSA Football Championship over Alleman High School in Champaign, Illinois at Memorial Stadium.

During his senior season, Lunt completed 253-for-346 (73%) of his passes, and threw 3,651 yards, 31 TDs, and 4 INTs in 10 games in 2011. This gave Lunt career numbers of 478-for-664 (72%) completions, 7,418 yards, 65 TDs, and 8 INTs. In 2011, Lunt led the Rockets to a second straight 4A IHSA Football Championship with a 42-39 victory in the over Richmond-Burton Community High School at Memorial Stadium in Champaign, Illinois. In the state title game, Lunt set an Illinois state title game record, throwing for 506 total yards. In fact, he started a state championship streak that lasted until 2015, winning the Rockets 5 State Championship in row.

Lunt committed to play at the Oklahoma State University saying that he probably would have ended up at the University of Illinois if Reilly O'Toole had not already committed to play at Illinois. Ironically, Lunt would end up transferring to Illinois after his freshman season in Stillwater, Oklahoma where he would become teammates with O'Toole.

Lunt was named a member of the 2011 Illinois All-State Team as selected by the Associated Press, Chicago Tribune, Chicago Sun-Times, News-Gazette, and the Illinois Football Coaches Association. Lunt was also selected to play in the Semper Fidelis All-American Bowl at Chase Field in Phoenix. He was also named the 2011 News-Gazette All-State Player of the Year

College career

Oklahoma State
As a true freshman at Oklahoma State University in 2012, Lunt was named the starting quarterback to open the season. He became the first true freshman to start an opening game for Oklahoma State since 1950 and the first true freshman to start a game since Tone Jones in 1993. Overall, he played in six games and started five, completing 81 of 131 passes for 1,108 yards, six touchdowns and seven interceptions.

Illinois
After his freshman season, Lunt transferred to the University of Illinois. After sitting out the 2013 season due to transfer rules, Lunt was named the starting quarterback for the 2014 season. In the October 4 game at home against Purdue, Lunt was removed from the game with an apparent leg injury. Upon further tests, it was revealed that Lunt had suffered a fractured fibula in his left leg. The injury kept Lunt sidelined from athletic activities for a few weeks.

Statistics
Lunt's college statistics were as follows:

Professional career

After going undrafted in the 2017 NFL Draft, Lunt signed with the Minnesota Vikings as an undrafted free agent on May 1, 2017. On July 28, 2017, he was waived by the Vikings.

Following his brief stint in the NFL, Lunt currently works as an insurance consultant at Troxell.

References

External links
Illinois Fighting Illini bio
Oklahoma State Cowboys bio

1993 births
Living people
Sportspeople from Springfield, Illinois
Players of American football from Illinois
American football quarterbacks
Oklahoma State Cowboys football players
Illinois Fighting Illini football players
Minnesota Vikings players